The Servants Anonymous Society (SAS) is a nonprofit women's organization that provides aid to young women in exiting the sex industry, achieving sobriety, and avoiding sexual slavery. SAS offers life skills-based education to these women and safe houses for them to live in. One of the skills taught by SAS is how to prepare a budget. SAS partners with Sex Trade 101. In 2008 and 2009, there were book sales in Calgary, Alberta in support of SAS and Canwest Raise-a-Reader. In July 2011, paramedic Will Rogers performed a 1,000 km long-distance run to raise funds for the Surrey, British Columbia chapter of SAS. That December, the Surrey chapter received a $20,000 award at the Awards for Excellence ceremony hosted by the William H. Donner Foundation. In 2013, there was a fundraiser called "Cry of the Streets: An Evening for Freedom" that raised money for Servants Anonymous Facilitates Exit, a SAS women's shelter for those seeking to leave the sex industry.

References

External links
 Official website

Charities based in Canada
Prostitution in Canada
Feminist organizations in Canada
Social welfare charities
Addiction organizations in Canada
Women's shelters in Canada